Hepato-biliary diseases include liver diseases and biliary diseases. Their study is known as hepatology.

Liver diseases

Viral hepatitis
 Acute hepatitis A
 Acute hepatitis B
 Acute hepatitis C
 Acute hepatitis D – this is a superinfection with the delta-agent in a patient already infected with hepatitis B
 Acute hepatitis E
 Chronic viral hepatitis
 Other viral hepatitis viruses may exist but their relation to the disease is not firmly established like the previous ones (hepatitis F, GB virus C, hepatitis X)

Other infectious diseases
 Hepatitis:
 cytomegalovirus infection
 herpesviral: herpes simplex infection
 Toxoplasmosis
 Hepatosplenic schistosomiasis
 Portal hypertension in schistosomiasis
 Liver disease in syphilis
 Epstein–Barr virus infection
 yellow fever virus infection
 rubella virus infection
 leptospirosis
 Echinococcosis
 Amoebiasis

Other inflammatory diseases
 liver abscess
 autoimmune hepatitis
 primary biliary cholangitis (primary biliary cirrhosis)
 phlebitis of the portal vein
 granulomatous hepatitis
 berylliosis
 sarcoidosis
 nonalcoholic steatohepatitis (NASH)

Alcohol
This may cause fatty liver, hepatitis, fibrosis and sclerosis leading to cirrhosis and finally liver failure.

Toxins
This includes mostly drug-induced hepatotoxicity, (DILI) which may generate many different patterns over liver disease, including
 cholestasis
 necrosis
 acute hepatitis and chronic hepatitis of different forms,
 cirrhosis
 Effects of Acetaminophen (Tylenol)
 other rare disorders like focal nodular hyperplasia, Hepatic fibrosis, peliosis hepatis and veno-occlusive disease.
Liver damage is part of Reye syndrome.

Tumours
Malignant neoplasm of liver and intrahepatic bile ducts. The most frequent forms are metastatic malignant neoplasm of liver)
 liver cell carcinoma
 hepatocellular carcinoma
 hepatoma
 cholangiocarcinoma
 hepatoblastoma
 angiosarcoma of liver
 Kupffer cell sarcoma
 other sarcomas of liver

Benign neoplasm of liver include hepatic hemangiomas, hepatic adenomas, and focal nodular hyperplasia (FNH).

End-stage liver disease
Chronic liver diseases like chronic hepatitis, chronic alcohol abuse or chronic toxic liver disease may cause
 liver failure and hepatorenal syndrome
 fibrosis and cirrhosis of liver
Cirrhosis may also occur in primary biliary cirrhosis. Rarely, cirrhosis is congenital.

Metabolic diseases
 metabolic diseases (chapter E in ICD-10)
 haemochromatosis
 Wilson's disease
 Gilbert's syndrome
 Crigler–Najjar syndrome
 Dubin–Johnson syndrome
 Rotor syndrome

Vascular disorders
 chronic passive congestion of liver
 central haemorrhagic necrosis of liver
 infarction of liver
 peliosis hepatis
 veno-occlusive disease
 portal hypertension
 Budd–Chiari syndrome

Cysts
 Congenital cystic disease of the liver
 Cysts caused by Echinococcus
 Polycystic liver disease

Others
Amyloid degeneration of liver

Gallbladder and biliary tract diseases
 malignant neoplasm of the gallbladder
 malignant neoplasm of other parts of biliary tract
 extrahepatic bile duct
 ampulla of Vater
 cholelithiasis
 cholecystitis
 others (excluding postcholecystectomy syndrome), but including
 other obstructions of the gallbladder (like strictures)
 hydrops, perforation, fistula
 cholesterolosis
 biliary dyskinesia
 ICD-10 code K83: other diseases of the biliary tract:
 cholangitis (including ascending cholangitis and primary sclerosing cholangitis)
 obstruction, perforation, fistula of biliary tract (bile duct)
 spasm of sphincter of Oddi
 biliary cyst
 biliary atresia

References
ICD-10 codes K70-K77: Liver Diseases 

Diseases of liver
Hepatology